The Druzhba pipeline (also has been referred to as the Friendship Pipeline and the Comecon Pipeline) is one of the world's longest oil pipelines and one of the largest oil pipeline networks in the world. It began operation in 1964 and remains in operation in 2023. The network also branches out into numerous smaller pipelines to deliver its product throughout Eastern Europe and beyond.

The name "Druzhba" means "friendship", alluding to the fact that the pipeline supplied oil to the energy-hungry western regions of the Soviet Union, to its "fraternal socialist allies" in the former Soviet bloc, and to western Europe. Today, it is the largest principal artery for the transportation of Russian (and Kazakh) oil across Europe.

History 
On 18 December 1958, the 10th session of the Council for Mutual Economic Assistance (Comecon), held in Prague, adopted a decision and an agreement was signed on construction of a trunk crude oil pipeline from the USSR into Poland, Czechoslovakia, GDR and Hungary. Each country was to supply all necessary construction materials, machinery and equipment. Czechoslovakia received first oil in 1962, Hungary in September 1963, Poland in November 1963, and the GDR in December 1963. The whole pipeline was put into operation in October 1964. The first oil pumped through the Druzhba pipeline originated from the oil fields in Tatarstan and Samara (Kuybyshev) Oblast. In the 1970s, the Druzhba pipeline system was further enlarged with the construction of geographically parallel lines.

Route 
The pipeline begins at Almetyevsk in Tatarstan, the Russian heartland, where it collects oil from western Siberia, the Urals, and the Caspian Sea. It runs to Mazyr in southern Belarus, where it splits into a northern and southern branch. The northern branch crosses the remainder of Belarus across Poland to Schwedt in Germany. It supplies refineries in Płock and in Schwedt. The northern branch is also connected by the Płock–Gdańsk pipeline with the Naftoport terminal in Gdańsk, which is used for oil re-exports. In Schwedt, the Druzhba pipeline is connected with the MVL pipeline to Rostock and Spergau.
The southern branch runs south through Ukraine. In Brody, the Druzhba pipeline is connected with the Odessa-Brody pipeline, which is currently used to ship oil from the Druzhba pipeline to the Black Sea. In Uzhgorod, the pipeline splits into lines to Slovakia (Druzhba-1 — original Druzhba route) and to Hungary (Druzhba-2). The line through Slovakia is divided once again near Bratislava: one branch leading in a northwest direction to the Czech Republic and the other going southward to Hungary. The Druzhba-1 pipeline branches off toward Hungary in Banská Bystrica Region (Slovakia) near the river of Ipeľ, crosses the Hungarian border at Drégelypalánk and leads to Százhalombatta (not depicted on the map at the beginning of the page). In Hungary, the Druzhba-1 pipeline supplies the Duna refinery while Druzhba-2 supplies Duna and Tisza refineries.

The ORLEN Lietuva in Lithuania and Ventspils oil terminal in Latvia are connected to the main pipeline by the branch pipeline from the Unecha junction in Bryansk Oblast (not shown on the map). This branch has ceased operation in 2006 and is not likely to become operational again any time soon.

The pipeline crosses 45 major rivers as well as 200 railways and highways.

Technical features 
The pipes for the project were manufactured in the Soviet Union and Poland, while fittings were manufactured in Czechoslovakia. The GDR was responsible for pumps, and Hungary for automation and communication equipment. The construction cost nearly 400 million rubles and nearly 730,000 tons of pipe was laid throughout the path of the pipeline. Work is currently underway to increase this in the section between Belarus and Poland. It uses 20 pumping stations.

Operators
The Russian part of the pipeline is operated by the oil company Transneft through its subsidiary OAO MN Druzhba. The operator in Belarus is Gomeltransneft Druzhba, in Ukraine UkrTransNafta, in Poland PERN Przyjazn SA, in Slovakia Transpetrol AS, in the Czech Republic Mero, and in Hungary MOL.

Baltic Pipeline System-2

The throughput capacity of BPS-2 is 50 million tonnes of oil annually. The construction of the BPS-2 started on 10 June 2009. The BPS-2 was completed in 2011 and began to function in late March 2012.

Proposed extensions

Druzhba Wilhelmshaven Oil Pipeline

There have been proposals to the extend northern branch of the Druzhba pipeline towards the German North Sea port of Wilhelmshaven, which would reduce oil tanker traffic in the Baltic Sea and make it easier to transport Russian oil to the United States. In 2007, German Oil Trading GmbH (GOT) proposed to build a connection from Unecha to Wilhelmshaven with a possible branch to Polish and German oil refineries.

Druzhba Adria
The Druzhba–Adria Pipeline Integration Project was a proposal that was considered in the 2000s to extend the pipeline to pass through Hungary and Croatia to reach the Adriatic Sea at the deep-water port of Omišalj. In the first phase, the Croatian portion of the Adria pipeline would be reconstructed from the Sisak pumping station to Omišalj harbour. The Croatian company JANAF was responsible for the design of the initial project phase, to reverse the phases of the Adria pipeline (which currently carries oil from the port inland) on the Sisak-Omišalj portion.

It was also proposed to connect Druzhba Adria with the planned Pan-European Pipeline.

The proposal was touted by the Croatian president Stipe Mesić, but it also garnered a lot of negative press due to complaints from the environmentalist groups such as Eko Kvarner, and was eventually abandoned.

Schwechat–Bratislava Oil Pipeline
The Schwechat–Bratislava two-way oil pipeline project was proposed in 2003. It would allow to supply the OMV owned Schwechat Refinery from the Druzhba pipeline.

Controversies

Parallel disputes on transit fees

For the last several years, Russia and Ukraine have been tied up in transit fee disputes as the major pipelines supplying Europe with Russian oil and gas run through Ukraine. The continuous disputes were primarily based on transit of natural gas. 
On December 28, 2009, referring to Russia's announcement, Slovakian government said Russia issued warnings that it would stop oil supplies to Slovakia, Hungary and the Czech Republic over a transit fees dispute with Ukraine. However, the next day, Ukraine's Naftogas issued a statement confirming that Russia agreed to a 30 percent increase in the transit fees through Ukraine. The alleged rise in the tariff will be from $7.8 to $9.50 (or €6.6) per tonne of oil for transiting Ukraine in 2010, and this was implemented due to the decision from Russia to raise prices of the energy resources. Additionally, unlike previous payments, new payments will be made in Euros, as this was one of Ukraine's demands. Also, Ukraine needs substantial investments to update the network on its territory as the pipeline has aged. Russia and Ukraine also agreed on the volume of oil to be transported through Ukraine in 2010. The overall amount of oil to be transported to Slovakia, the Czech Republic and Hungary through Ukraine in 2010 will be 15 million tonnes, a decrease from 17.1 million tonnes in 2008.

2019 oil contamination scandal
The delivery of oil was halted on 20 April 2019 due to high concentrations of organic chloride found in the pipeline. These chemical compounds contaminated the pipeline and equipment in Russia and Europe causing an economic impact of billions of dollars. Investigation into the scandal is ongoing with individuals being detained in Russia suspected of having stolen oil and pouring in organochloride to the pipeline to cover up the theft.

Disputes over payment for contaminated oil were ongoing a month later.

By late May, a month after the contamination was discovered, Russia agreed to take back some of the 8-9m tons of contaminated oil remaining in the pipeline.

Estimates of overall contaminated stock, including that still in the pipeline and other stock pumped to tankers or to storage range from 20-40m tons as of end May. This stock will all require dilution before it can be refined.

In mid-September 2019, almost five months after the contamination was noticed, the Polish pipeline operator confirmed their section of the pipeline had been cleared of contamination and was operating normally. 450,000 tons of contaminated oil had been moved to storage.

Also in September 2019, oil companies BP and Total were trying to sell 2.3m barrels (over 300,000 tons) of tainted oil that they had received earlier from the pipeline.

Belarus–Russia relations
In February 2020, Belarus threatened to take oil from the Druzhba pipeline if Russia did not supply it with the required volumes of crude oil. As of February 2022, Russian oil supplies to Belarus had not been agreed to for 2020 and shipments had dwindled to 500,000 tonnes, down from a previously planned 2 million tonnes. Belarusian President Alexander Lukashenko said Moscow hinted at an energy supply deal in exchange for Belarus merging with Russia, which caused talks to collapse.

See also 

 Yamal–Europe pipeline
 Urengoy–Pomary–Uzhhorod pipeline
 Russia–Ukraine gas disputes
 Russia–Belarus energy dispute
 Baku–Tbilisi–Ceyhan pipeline - the next longest oil pipeline after Druzhba

References

External links
 Druzhba-Adria Pipeline Integration Project, Transneft website

1960 establishments in Europe
Oil pipelines in Russia
Oil pipelines in Ukraine
Oil pipelines in Belarus
Oil pipelines in Poland
Oil pipelines in Slovakia
Oil pipelines in the Czech Republic
Oil pipelines in Hungary
Oil pipelines in the Soviet Union
Oil pipelines in Germany
Buildings and structures built in the Soviet Union
Transneft
Eastern Bloc
Comecon
Foreign relations of the Soviet Union
Czechoslovakia–Soviet Union relations
East Germany–Soviet Union relations
Germany–Soviet Union relations
Hungary–Soviet Union relations
Poland–Soviet Union relations